Salami (also Romanized as Sālamī and Sālemī; also known as Sālemī-ye Yek) is a village in Salami Rural District, Khanafereh District, Shadegan County, Khuzestan Province, Iran. At the 2006 census, its population was 2,173, in 375 families.

References 

Populated places in Shadegan County